The 1974 Irish local elections were held in all the counties, cities and towns of Ireland on Tuesday, 18 June 1974.

Results

Total seats

 "Clann na Poblachta" officially dissolved in 1965 however local election candidates continued to use the name of the party until the 1974 local elections.

County councils 

The Donegal non-party councillors were members of the Independent Fianna Fáil organisation.
The non-party Monaghan councillors were nominated by the Protestant Association.

Large corporations 

 Six of the seven non-party members of Dublin Corporation were elected as Community candidates, including Seán Dublin Bay Loftus and Carmencita Hederman.

Small corporations

References

See also 
Local government in the Republic of Ireland
:Category:Irish local government councils

1974 elections in the Republic of Ireland
Local elections
1974
June 1974 events in Europe